The subfamily Pseudophyllinae contains numerous species in the family Tettigoniidae, the katydids or bush crickets. Sometimes called "true katydids", together with the crickets of suborder Ensifera, they form part of the insect order Orthoptera which also contains grasshoppers.

Members of the group are noted for their remarkable camouflage. They closely resemble dried leaves, including veins, various blotches and even bite marks.

Systematics
The Pseudophyllinae may be subdivided into the following tribes (the first 17 of which are sometimes grouped into the super-tribes: Pleminiiti and Pseudophylliti) and genera. Some notable species are also listed here:

Aphractini 
Auth.: (Brunner von Wattenwyl 1895) - Chile
 Aphractus Redtenbacher, 1895
 Paraphractus Beier, 1962
 Polycleptidella Beier, 1962
 Polycleptis Karsch, 1891

Aspidonotini 
Auth.: (Brunner von Wattenwyl 1895) - Madagascar

 Aspidonotus Brullé, 1835

Callimenellini 
Auth.: (Gorochov 1990) - Asia: including India, Indo-China and the Philippines
 Callimenellus Walker, 1871

Cocconotini 
Auth.: (Brunner von Wattenwyl 1895) - Central and southern America

 Beierotettix Özdikmen, 2007
 Bliastes Stål, 1873
 Bliastonotideus Beier, 1962
 Bliastonotus Beier, 1960
 Brachybliastes Beier, 1960
 Calamoptera Saussure, 1861
 Chrysobliastes Beier, 1960
 Cobalotettix Beier, 1962
 Cocconotus Stål, 1873 
 Cojedebius Kevan, 1989
 Diplopygia Beier, 1962
 Docidocercus Beier, 1960
 Eubliastes Beier, 1960
 Geonotus Beier, 1960
 Helicocercus Beier, 1960
 Idiarthron Brunner von Wattenwyl, 1895
 Incanotus Beier, 1960
 Jamaicoecia Beier, 1962
 Leiobliastes Beier, 1960
 Liparoscelis Stål, 1873
 Liparoscella Hebard, 1933
 Melanonotus Brunner von Wattenwyl, 1895
 Meroncidius Serville, 1831
 Mystron Montealegre-Z. & Morris, 1999
 Nannonotus Beier, 1960
 Nannotettix Redtenbacher, 1895
 Nastonotus Bolívar, 1890
 Natagaima Beier, 1960
 Nesoecia Scudder, 1893
 Nesonotus Beier, 1960
 Schedocentrus Hebard, 1924
 Sphaeropyga Beier, 1960
 Stenotettix Stål, 1873
 Thamnobates Saussure & Pictet, 1898
 Trichotettix Stål, 1873

Cymatomerini 
Auth.: (Brunner von Wattenwyl 1895) - Central Africa and Asia: including India, Indo-China, Malesia and the Philippines

 Cymatomera Schaum, 1853 (Africa)
 Cymatomerella Beier, 1954 (Africa)
 Olcinia Stål, 1877
 Parasanaa Beier, 1944
 Platenia Dohrn, 1888 - monotypic Platenia semialata (Philippines)
 Sanaa Walker, 1870
 Sathrophyllia Stål, 1874
 Sathrophylliopsis de Jong, 1939 (W. Malesia)
 Tegra Walker, 1870
 Tegrolcinia de Jong, 1939 (China, W. Malesia)
 Typhoptera Kirby, 1906

Eucocconotini 
Auth.: Beier 1960 - Central and South America

 Dicranostomus Dohrn, 1888
 Eucocconotideus Beier, 1960
 Eucocconotus Hebard, 1927
 Gnathoclita Hagenbach, 1842
 Myopophyllum Beier, 1960
 Onychopygia Beier, 1962
 Panoploscelis Scudder, 1869

Homalaspidiini 
Auth.: (Otte, D. 1997) - Southern America
 Arrhenotettix Caudell, 1918
 Disceratus Scudder, 1869
 Homalaspidia Uvarov, 1940
 Jimenezia Bolívar, 1881
 Sterphoter Rehn, 1946

Ischnomelini 
Auth.: (Beier 1960) - Southern America
 Goethalsiella Hebard, 1927
 Ischnomela Stål, 1873

Leptotettigini 
Auth.: (Beier 1960) - Southern America
 Chondrosternum Beier, 1960
 Leptotettix Stål, 1873
 Macrochiton Redtenbacher, 1895
 Neochiton Beier, 1962
 Pezochiton Beier, 1960
 Platychiton Beier, 1960
 Semileptotettix Brunner von Wattenwyl, 1895

Pantecphylini 
Auth.: (Brunner von Wattenwyl 1895) - Central Africa
 Pantecphylus Karsch, 1890

Phrictini 
Auth.: Bolívar, 1903 - sometimes placed in the Mecopodinae (Eastern Australia)

 Phricta Redtenbacher, 1892

Phyllomimini 
Auth.: (Brunner von Wattenwyl 1895) - West and central Africa; Australasia: India through to Pacific islands

 Acanthoprion Pictet & Saussure, 1892
 Acauloplacella Karny, 1931
 Acauloplax Karsch, 1891
 Brochopeplus Pictet & Saussure, 1892
 Brunneriana Uvarov, 1923
 Chondrodera Karsch, 1890
 Chondroderella Hebard, 1922
 Despoina Brunner von Wattenwyl, 1895
 Diplodontopus Karny, 1931
 Gonyatopus Brunner von Wattenwyl, 1895
 Hapalophyllum Hebard, 1922
 Hemigyrus Brunner von Wattenwyl, 1893
 Heteraprium Krauss, 1903
 Lacipoda Brunner von Wattenwyl, 1895
 Lagarodes Karsch, 1890
 Margarodera Beier, 1957
 Mioacris Pictet & Saussure, 1892
 Morsimus Stål, 1877
 Orophyllus Beier, 1954
 Paramorsimus Beier, 1954
 Paraphyllomimus Beier, 1954
 Phyllomimus Stål, 1873
 Phyllozelus Redtenbacher, 1892
 Pirmeda Henry, 1940
 Promeca Brunner von Wattenwyl, 1895
 Pseudacanthoprion Beier, 1954
 Pseudophyllomimus Karny, 1924
 Rhinodera Beier, 1955
 Stenampyx Karsch, 1890
 Stizoscepa Karsch, 1896
 Temnophylloides Henry, 1939
 Temnophyllus Redtenbacher, 1895
 Timanthes Stål, 1877
 Tomias Karsch, 1890
 Tympanophyllum Krauss, 1903
 Tympanoptera Redtenbacher, 1892
 Zumala Walker, 1869

Platyphyllini 
Auth.: (Brunner von Wattenwyl 1895) - Southern America

 Acyrophyllum Beier, 1960
 Aemasia Brunner von Wattenwyl, 1895
 Antillophyllum Beier, 1960
 Baliophyllum Beier, 1962
 Brachyauchenus Brunner von Wattenwyl, 1895
 Choeroparnops Dohrn, 1888
 Diyllus Stål, 1875
 Drepanoxiphus Brunner von Wattenwyl, 1895
 Haenschiella Beier, 1960
 Kopis Beier, 1960
 Myrmeciophyllum Beier, 1960
 Opetiocercus Beier, 1960
 Platyphyllum Serville, 1831
 Rhabdotophyllum Beier, 1960
 Triencentrus Brunner von Wattenwyl, 1895
 Xiphophyllum Beier, 1960

Pleminiini 
Auth.: (Brunner von Wattenwyl 1895) - Central and southern America, West and central Africa

 Acanthodis Serville, 1831
 Acanthorhinischia Beier, 1954
 Adapantus Karsch, 1891
 Adeclus Brunner von Wattenwyl, 1895
 Adenes Karsch, 1891
 Amiltonia Piza, 1976
 Ancistrocercus Beier, 1954
 Anonistus Walker, 1871
 Apereisis Walker, 1871
 Aspidopygia Beier, 1962
 Balboana Uvarov, 1939
 Batodromeus Karsch, 1896
 Beieroschema Özdikmen, 2008 (formerly Colobotettix Beier, 1960 (non Ribaut, 1948: preoccupied))
 Bufotettix Caudell, 1918
 Championica Saussure & Pictet, 1898
 Clepsydronotus Beier, 1954
 Condylocnemis Redtenbacher, 1895
 Corynecercus Beier, 1954
 Dasyscelidius Beier, 1954
 Dasyscelus Redtenbacher, 1895
 Diacanthodis Walker, 1870
 Enthacanthodes Redtenbacher, 1895
 Gongrocnemis Redtenbacher, 1895
 Habrocomes Karsch, 1890
 Haemodiasma Brunner von Wattenwyl, 1895
 Hoplidostylus Karsch, 1893
 Jamaicana Brunner von Wattenwyl, 1895
 Labidocercus Beier, 1954
 Leurophyllidium Beier, 1954
 Leurophyllum Kirby, 1906
 Lichenochrus Karsch, 1890
 Mormotus Karsch, 1890
 Nesokatoikos Braun & Maehr, 2008 (formerly Nesocnemis Beier, 1954 (non Sélys, 1891: preoccupied))
 Nesophyllidium Beier, 1954
 Orpacanthophora Beier, 1954
 Paradeclus Beier, 1954
 Paralichenochrus Beier, 1954
 Parapleminia Beier, 1954
 Pedinothorax Beier, 1954
 Phyllostachydius Beier, 1954
 Pleminia Stål, 1874
 Polyglochin Karsch, 1890
 Pristonotus Uvarov, 1940
 Pseudopleminia Beier, 1954
 Rhinischia Beier, 1954
 Schochia Brunner von Wattenwyl, 1895
 Sphyrophyllum Beier, 1954
 Stenoschema Redtenbacher, 1895
 Tetragonomera Stål, 1874
 Tympanocompus Karsch, 1891
 Xerophyllopteryx Rehn, 1905

Polyancistrini 
Auth.: (Brunner von Wattenwyl 1895) - Mexico, Caribbean, Southern America
 Camposiella Hebard, 1924
 Polyancistroides Rehn, 1901
 Polyancistrus Serville, 1831
 Sagephorus Redtenbacher, 1895
 Spelaeala Rehn, 1943
 Spinapecta Naskrecki & Lopes-Andrade, 2005

Pseudophyllini 
Auth.: (Burmeister 1838) - West and central Africa; Asia: India, Indo-China through to Papua New Guinea

 Brunneana Uvarov, 1939
 Chloracris Pictet & Saussure, 1892
 Climacoptera Redtenbacher, 1895
 Cratioma Bolívar, 1906
 Desaulcya Bolívar, 1906
 Liocentrum Karsch, 1890
 Micta Karsch, 1896
 Mustius Stål, 1874
 Onomarchus Stål, 1874
 Opisthodicrus Karsch, 1890
 Oxyaspis Brunner von Wattenwyl, 1895
 Perteus Bolívar, 1906
 Pseudophyllus Serville, 1831
 Pseudophyllus titan
 Rhomboptera Redtenbacher, 1895
 Zabalius Bolívar, 1886
 Zabalius apicalis

Pterophyllini 
Auth.: (Karny, 1925) – Americas

 Caloxiphus Saussure & Pictet, 1898
 Caribophyllum Rehn, 1947
 Diophanes Stål, 1875
 Elytraspis Beier, 1962
 Karukerana Bonfils, 1965
 Lea Caudell, 1906
 Lophaspis Redtenbacher, 1895
 Mastophyllum Beier, 1960
 Paracyrtophyllus Caudell, 1906
 Parascopioricus Beier, 1960
 Phyllopectis Rehn, 1948
 Pterophylla Kirby, 1825
 Scopioricus Uvarov, 1940
 Scopiorinus Beier, 1960
 Thliboscelus Serville, 1838
 Xestoptera Redtenbacher, 1895

Simoderini 
Auth.: (Brunner von Wattenwyl, 1895) - Madagascar, Australia
 Chloracantha Hebard, 1922
 Lonchitophyllum Brunner von Wattenwyl, 1895
 Mastigaphoides Weidner, 1965
 Mastighapha Karsch, 1891
 Parasimodera Carl, 1914
 Phyrama Karsch, 1889
 Simodera Karsch, 1891
 Wattenwyliella Carl, 1914

Teleutiini 
Auth.: (Beier, 1960) - Panama to Southern America
 Acanthodiphrus Walker, 1871
 Apteroteleutias Beier, 1962
 Beierella Piza, 1978
 Brachyteleutias Beier, 1960
 Chibchella Hebard, 1927
 Eumecopterus Beier, 1960
 Hoplotettix Caudell, 1918
 Leptoteleutias Beier, 1962
 Mylothrella Beier, 1960
 Pemba Walker, 1870
 Stetharasa Montealegre-Z. & Morris, 1999
 Teleutias Stål, 1874

Tribe undetermined 
 Narea Walker, 1870 - Australia
 †Archepseudophylla Nel, Prokop & Ross, 2008

Due to the great diversity of this subfamily, it is not unequivocally delimited yet.

References

External links
 

 
Orthoptera subfamilies
Taxa named by Hermann Burmeister